"Sugaree" is a song with lyrics by long-time Grateful Dead lyricist Robert Hunter and music by guitarist Jerry Garcia. It was written for Jerry Garcia's first solo album Garcia, which was released in January 1972. As with the songs on the rest of the album, Garcia plays every instrument himself except drums, played by Bill Kreutzmann, including acoustic guitar, bass guitar, and an electric guitar played through a Leslie speaker. Released as a single from the Garcia album, "Sugaree" peaked at #94 on the Billboard Hot 100 in April 1972 and was Garcia's only single ever on that chart.

The song was first performed live by the Grateful Dead on July 31, 1971, at the Yale Bowl at Yale University, as was the song "Mr. Charlie". They played the song in numerous other concerts, including those later released as Dick's Picks Volume 3 and One from the Vault.

Predecessors 
Rusty York recorded a Marty Robbins-penned song in 1959 (Chess 1730) also called, "Sugaree".

Elizabeth Cotten, a North Carolina folksinger, wrote and recorded a song called "Shake Sugaree" in 1966. The chorus of Cotten's song is "Oh lordie me/Didn't I shake sugaree?" Hunter was aware of this song when he wrote "Sugaree."

Fred Neil released a song in 1966 on his eponymous album called "I've Got a Secret (Didn't We Shake Sugaree)."
It can also be heard on "Echoes of My Mind - The Best of Fred Neil 1963-1971".

In 1970, singer-songwriter Keith Colley released the single "Sugaree (Sugar Every Day And Night Girl)" on the Challenge label.

References in popular culture
The song is mentioned in Stephen King's 1981 novel Cujo.

The Persuasions included this song on their 2000 album of Grateful Dead covers, Might as Well… The Persuasions Sing Grateful Dead.

Graham Parker covered the track on his 2004 album, Your Country.

Nick Barker covered this song on his album Black Water Blues released in 2009.

Jackie Greene recorded a cover for his 2009 release The Grateful EP.

On the 2016 charity album Day of the Dead, "Sugaree" was covered by Jenny Lewis and the band Phosphorescent.

See also
 Dark Star
 Musical improvisation

References

External links
 Dead.net, the official homepage of the Grateful Dead.

1972 songs
American folk songs
Grateful Dead songs
Songs with lyrics by Robert Hunter (lyricist)
Songs written by Jerry Garcia